Mount Morrison is located in the Sierra Nevada, in the Sherwin Range. It rises south of Convict Lake near the town of Mammoth Lakes.

History
The mountain was named for Robert Morrison, a merchant in the town of Benton, who was killed near Convict Lake on September 23, 1871, while he was acting as member of a posse pursuing escaped convicts from the Nevada State Penitentiary. Nearby is Mono Jim Peak which is named for Mono Jim, a Paiute guide, who died in the same gun fight.

Climbing
Sources state that Norman Clyde climbed to the peak on June 22, 1928, and that John Mendendhall also reached the summit in 1928 but the month of his ascent is not documented. There are several routes to the summit, the easiest consisting of a Class 2 scramble and bushwack.

Due to its imposing north face, Mount Morrison is also nicknamed the "Eiger of the Sierra." The east face consists of extremely loose rock and one should exercise extreme caution when attempting the face.

Geology

Highly tilted and faulted metasedimentary rocks are exposed on Mount Morrison.  Formations include the Ordovician Convict Lake Formation (argillite and siliceous hornfels and slate), the Lower Devonian to Silurian Aspen Meadow Formation (siliceous and calc-silicate hornfels), the Middle Devonian Mount Morrison Sandstone (calcareous quartz sandstone), and the Upper Devonian Squares Tunnel Formation (black chert and argillite).  The Mount Morrison Fault passes near the summit.

Fulgurites, natural hollow glass tubes, are found at the top of the mountain. These oddities are formed by lightning acting on certain types of sand or soil.

References

External links 
 

Mountains of the John Muir Wilderness
Mountains of Mono County, California
Mountains of Northern California